Agapetes serpens is a semi-climbing shrub species native to the Himalayas, 40–60 cm tall, grown as an ornamental for its attractive pendulous benches of red tubular flowers blooming over a long period. It is mostly grown in climates from cool temperate to sub-tropical. Propagation is from cuttings.

References

 Ellison, Don (1999) Cultivated Plants of the World. London: New Holland (1st ed.: Brisbane: Flora Publications International, 1995).
 Encyclopedia of Life entry
 GBIF entry

Vaccinioideae